Thatcher High School is a high school in Thatcher, Arizona. It is the only high school in the Thatcher Unified School District. Its current building opened in 2000.

Notable alumni
 Elliot Johnson, Current MLB player (Tampa Bay Rays)

References

Public high schools in Arizona
Schools in Graham County, Arizona